Rhinoclavis alexandri is a species of sea snail, a marine gastropod mollusk in the family Cerithiidae.

Description

Distribution
This marine species occurs off Natal, South Africa.

References

 Tomlin, J.R. le B. (1923). On South African marine Mollusca with descriptions of several new species. Journal of Conchology 17: 40–52
 Steyn, D.G. & Lussi, M. (1998) Marine Shells of South Africa. An Illustrated Collector's Guide to Beached Shells. Ekogilde Publishers, Hartebeespoort, South Africa, ii + 264 pp
 Steyn, D.G & Lussi, M. (2005). Offshore Shells of Southern Africa: A pictorial guide to more than 750 Gastropods. Published by the authors. Pp. i–vi, 1–289.

External links

Cerithiidae
Gastropods described in 1923